Aa aurantiaca is a species of orchid in the genus Aa native to Peru. It was described by Delsy Trujillo in 2011.

References

aurantiaca
Flora of Peru
Plants described in 2011